Hălăucești is a commune in Iași County, Western Moldavia, Romania. It is composed of two villages, Hălăucești and Luncași (Lunkás).

At the 2002 census, 100% of inhabitants were ethnic Romanians. 88.2% were Roman Catholic and 11.7% Romanian Orthodox.

References

Communes in Iași County
Localities in Western Moldavia